Roman Vasylyovych Kuzmyn (born 19 June 1996) is a Ukrainian professional footballer who plays as a right-back for Ukrainian club Prykarpattia Ivano-Frankivsk.

References

External links
 Profile on Prykarpattia Ivano-Frankivsk official website
 
 

1996 births
Living people
Ukrainian footballers
Association football defenders
FC Hoverla Uzhhorod players
FC Prykarpattia Ivano-Frankivsk (1998) players
Ukrainian First League players
Ukrainian Second League players
Ukrainian expatriate footballers
Expatriate footballers in Germany
Ukrainian expatriate sportspeople in Germany
Sportspeople from Ivano-Frankivsk Oblast